Caecilia crassisquama is a species of caecilian in the family Caeciliidae. It is endemic to Ecuador and only known from the holotype collected in "Normandia, Zuñía, Río Upana", now in the Sangay National Park. It is a subterranean species that was collected in montane forest.

References

crassisquama
Amphibians of Ecuador
Endemic fauna of Ecuador
Taxa named by Edward Harrison Taylor
Amphibians described in 1968
Taxonomy articles created by Polbot